No Choice (Persian: مجبوریم‎, romanized: Majburim) is a 2020 Iranian drama film directed, written and produced by Reza Dormishian. The film screened for the first time at the 33rd Tokyo International Film Festival.

Synopsis 
The film is about three women who live in three different circumstances in Iran.

Cast 
 Fatemeh Motamed Arya as Dr. Mahshid Pendar
 Negar Javaherian as Sara Nedayi
 Parsa Pirouzfar as Dr. Sa'adat
 Pardis Ahmadieh as Golbahar Rezvani
 Mojtaba Pirzadeh as Mojtaba
 Bahman Farmanara as Mr. Shahriar
 Homayoun Ershadi as Hospital Manager
 Zhale Olov as Pendar's mother 
 Babak Karimi as Karim
 Reza Behbudi as Interrogator
 Maryam Boubani as Aunt Safieh
 Parivash Nazarieh as Mrs. Arshad
 Mehdi Nosrati as the Jenitor

References

External links 
 

2020s Persian-language films
2020 drama films
Iranian drama films